Since the israeli top-flight league's formation at the start of the 1931–32 season, 35 players have managed to accrue 100 or more goals in the league.

Nahum Stelmach holds the record for the fewest games taken to reach 100, doing so in 138 appearances.

Players

References

players with 100 or more goals